The snowy egret (Egretta thula) is a small white heron. The species name thula is the Araucano term for the black-necked swan, applied to this species in error by Chilean naturalist Juan Ignacio Molina in 1782.

The snowy egret is the American counterpart to the very similar Old World little egret, which has become established in the Bahamas. At one time, the plumes of the snowy egret were in great demand as decorations for women's hats. They were hunted for these plumes and this reduced the population of the species to dangerously low levels. Now protected in the United States by law, under the Migratory Bird Treaty Act, this bird's population has rebounded.

Description 
Adult snowy egrets are entirely white apart from the yellow lores between the long black bill and the eye, black legs, and bright yellow feet. The nape and neck bear long, shaggy plumes known as aigrettes. Immature snowy egrets have duller, greenish legs.

Measurements:

 Length: 
 Weight: 
 Wingspan:

Distribution and habitat
The snowy egret is native to North, Central and South America. It is present all year round in South America, ranging as far south as Chile and Argentina. It also occurs throughout the year in the West Indies, Florida and coastal regions of North and Central America. Elsewhere, in the southern part of the United States, it is migratory, breeding in California, Nevada, Utah, Colorado, Arizona, New Mexico, Texas, Louisiana and Mississippi. It is found in wetlands of many types; marshes, riverbanks, lakesides, pools, salt marshes and estuaries. It is not found at high altitudes nor generally on the coast. 
The snowy egret has occurred as a vagrant in Europe, in Iceland, Scotland and the Azores. It has also been recorded in South Africa.

Diet 
The birds eat fish, crustaceans (such as crabs, shrimp and crayfish), insects, small reptiles (such as lizards and snakes), snails, frogs, toads and worms (especially earthworms and other annelids). They stalk prey in shallow water, often running or shuffling their feet, flushing prey into view by swaying their heads, flicking their wings or vibrating their bills. They may also hover, or "dip-fish" by flying with their feet just above the water surface. Snowy egrets may also stand still and wait to ambush prey, or hunt for insects stirred up by domestic animals in open fields. They sometimes forage in mixed species groups.

Breeding
Snowy egrets breed in mixed colonies, which may include great egrets, night herons, tricolored herons, little blue herons, cattle egrets, glossy ibises and roseate spoonbills. The male establishes a territory and starts building the nest in a tree, vines or thick undergrowth. He then attracts a mate with an elaborate courtship display which includes dipping up and down, bill raising, aerial displays, diving, tumbling and calling. The immediate vicinity of the nest is defended from other birds and the female finishes the construction of the nest with materials brought by the male. Up to six pale bluish-green eggs are laid which hatch after about 24 days. The young are altricial and covered with white down when first hatched. They leave the nest after about 22 days.

Fossil finds 
Fossils of the snowy egret have been reported from the Talara tar seeps of Peru and in Bradenton in Manatee County and Haile XIB in Alachua County in Florida, United States. The deposits were dated to the Late Pleistocene.

Status
In the early twentieth century, the snowy egret was hunted extensively for their long breeding plumes that fashionable ladies wore on their hats. This trade was ended in 1910 in North America but continued for some time in Central and South America. Since then populations have recovered. The bird has a very wide range and the total population is large. No particular threats have been recognised and the population trend seems to be upwards, so the International Union for Conservation of Nature has assessed its conservation status as being of "least concern".

Gallery

References

Bibliography

Further reading 
 Stiles and Skutch, A guide to the birds of Costa Rica 
 National Geographic, Field Guide to the Birds of North America

External links 

 Snowy Egret – Cornell Lab of Ornithology
 Snowy egret Egretta thula - USGS Patuxent Bird Identification InfoCenter
 
 
 

snowy egret
Wading birds
Birds of the Americas
Birds of the Dominican Republic
Birds of the Colombian Andes
Pleistocene birds
Pleistocene Peru
Fossils of Peru
Pleistocene United States
Paleontology in Florida
Birds described in 1782
Extant Late Pleistocene first appearances